Occidental is a census-designated place (CDP) in Sonoma County, California, United States. The population was 1,115 at the 2010 census, down from 1,272 at the 2000 census.

History

Founded in 1876, Occidental was a stop on the North Pacific Coast Railroad connecting Cazadero to the Sausalito ferry. In return for donating right-of-way to the railroad, a local landowner named "Dutch Bill" Howards received a lifetime railway pass, and the station was named after him.

The railway caused a rapid expansion of the timber industry, and by 1877 there were six sawmills in the Occidental area. Trains also brought vacationers from San Francisco.

Howard’s Station Cafe is a restaurant that is located at the old narrow gauge railroad stop in downtown Occidental.

Geography

Climate
The cooperative National Weather Service station reports that Occidental has cool, wet winters and warm, dry summers.

Average annual snowfall is only .

Demographics

2010
At the 2010 census Occidental had a population of 1,115. The racial makeup of Occidental was 992 (89.0%) White, 7 (0.6%) African American, 7 (0.6%) Native American, 31 (2.8%) Asian, 0 (0.0%) Pacific Islander, 23 (2.1%) from other races, and 55 (4.9%) from two or more races. Hispanic or Latino of any race were 81 people (7.3%).

The census reported that 100% of the population lived in households.

There were 532 households, 134 (25.2%) had children under the age of 18 living in them, 228 (42.9%) were opposite-sex married couples living together, 44 (8.3%) had a female householder with no husband present, 25 (4.7%) had a male householder with no wife present. There were 39 (7.3%) unmarried opposite-sex partnerships, and 14 (2.6%) same-sex married couples or partnerships. 172 households (32.3%) were one person and 40 (7.5%) had someone living alone who was 65 or older. The average household size was 2.10. There were 297 families (55.8% of households); the average family size was 2.65.

The age distribution was 192 people (17.2%) under the age of 18, 52 people (4.7%) aged 18 to 24, 264 people (23.7%) aged 25 to 44, 462 people (41.4%) aged 45 to 64, and 145 people (13.0%) who were 65 or older. The median age was 48.5 years. For every 100 females, there were 103.8 males. For every 100 females age 18 and over, there were 99.8 males.

The homeowner vacancy rate was 4.2%; the rental vacancy rate was 6.6%. 70.3% of the population lived in owner-occupied housing units and 29.7% lived in rental housing units.

The median household income was $64,714 (+19.8% from 2000), and the median family income was $87,759 (+30.0% from 2000). The median per capita income for the CDP was $40,903 (+57.5% from 2000). For comparison, statewide California median per capita income in the 2010 Census was $27,885 (+22.8% from 2000).

2000
At the 2000 census there were 1,272 people, 524 households, and 319 families in the CDP. The population density was 255/sq mi (99/km). There were 632 housing units at an average density of 127/sq mi (49/km). The racial makeup of the CDP was 92.77% White, 0.55% African American, 0.79% Native American, 1.18% Asian, 0.24% Pacific Islander, 1.57% from other races, and 2.91% from two or more races. Hispanic or Latino of any race were 4.64%.

Of the 524 households, 32.3% had children under the age of 18 living with them, 46.2% were married couples living together, 10.3% had a female householder with no husband present, and 39.1% were non-families. 27.1% of households were one person and 5.2% were one person aged 65 or older. The average household size was 2.40 and the average family size was 2.91.

The age distribution was 22.8% under the age of 18, 7.6% from 18 to 24, 27.7% from 25 to 44, 33.3% from 45 to 64, and 8.6% 65 or older. The median age was 41 years. For every 100 females, there were 99.7 males. For every 100 females age 18 and over, there were 100.0 males.

The median household income was $54,000 and the median family income was $71,375. Males had a median income of $46,806 versus $29,306 for females. The per capita income for the CDP was $25,970. About 7.9% of families and 9.8% of the population were below the poverty line, including 13.7% of those under age 18 and none of those age 65 or over.

Economy
The large number of craft breweries and wineries in the area have made Barley and Hops Tavern and Sonoma Fine Wine store in downtown Occidental local and tourist destinations.

The tool-belt manufacturing company Occidental Leather started in an Occidental barn and later moved to downtown Occidental.

Government
In the state legislature, Occidental is in the 2nd Senate District and in the 2nd Assembly District.

Notable people

 Les Claypool, musician
 Nick Gravenites, musician
 Mickey Hart, musician
 Alicia Bay Laurel, artist, author and musician
 Terence McKenna, ethnobotanist
 Robert Nichols, actor
 Max Thieriot, actor, grew up in Occidental
 Kitaro, musician
 Tom Waits, musician

References

External links
 Occidental Chamber of Commerce

Census-designated places in Sonoma County, California
Census-designated places in California